is a former Japanese football player.

Playing career
Kuwabara was born in Hiroshima on October 2, 1971. After graduating from Osaka University of Health and Sport Sciences, he joined his local club Sanfrecce Hiroshima in 1994. He became a regular player from 1995 and played many matches for a long time. Although he played many matches as mainly defensive midfielder, he played as many position including central defender. The club won the 2nd place in 1995 and 1996 Emperor's Cup. However his opportunity to play decreased from 2002. In 2004, he moved to newly was promoted to J1 League club, Albirex Niigata. Although he played many matches as defensive midfielder in 2 seasons, he was released for generational change end of 2005 season. In 2006, he moved to Regional Leagues club New Wave Kitakyushu (later Giravanz Kitakyushu). In October 2010, he moved to Fagiano Okayama competing for promotion to Japan Football League (JFL). In 2011, he returned to Kitakyushu. He played as regular player and the club was promoted to JFL in 2008 and J2 League in 2010. He retired end of 2011 season at the age of 40.

Club statistics

References

External links

1971 births
Living people
Osaka University of Health and Sport Sciences alumni
Association football people from Hiroshima Prefecture
Japanese footballers
J1 League players
J2 League players
Japan Football League players
Sanfrecce Hiroshima players
Albirex Niigata players
Giravanz Kitakyushu players
Fagiano Okayama players
Association football midfielders